Platanisteia is a village in the Limassol District of Cyprus, located 6 km north of Pissouri. Prior to 1960, the village was inhabited almost exclusively by Turkish Cypriots. 

The village is now the home to the Hambis Printmaking Centre, an arts centre for artist-printmakers and museum of printmakers' works, founded by the Cypriot artist Hambis Tsangaris in 2008.

References

Communities in Limassol District